The 2013–14 season was the 109th overall season of football and the 80th season of competitive professional football in France.

Managerial changes

Ligue 1

Ligue 2

National

Transfers

Competitions

International competitions

Men's

Women's

National teams

France
Friendly

2014 FIFA World Cup qualification

Last updated: 7 August 2014Source: French Football Federation

France (Women's)
UEFA Women's Euro 2013

Last updated: 7 August 2013Source: French Football Federation

France U-21
Friendly

2015 UEFA European Under-21 Championship qualification

Last updated: 7 August 2014  Source: French Football Federation U-21 Schedule

France U-20

France U-19

France U-18

France U-17

France U-16

Notes

References

External links
Official site

 
Seasons in French football